Seán Buí Mac Bruideadha, Irish poet, fl. 14th century.

Seán Buí Mac Bruideadha who wrote a poem to Mathghamhain Maonmhaighe Ó Briain (died 1369), Dlighidh ollamh urraim ríogh.

The name is now anglicised as Mac Brody or Brody.

See also

 Diarmuid Mac Bruideadha, died 1563.
 Maoilin Mac Bruideadha, brother of the above, died 1582.
 Maoilin Óg Mac Bruideadha, son of the above, died 1602.
 Concubhair Mac Bruideadha, son of the above, alive 1636.
 Tadhg mac Dáire Mac Bruaideadha, c.1570-1652.

External links
 http://www.clarelibrary.ie/eolas/coclare/literature/bardic/clares_bardic_tradition.htm

References

 Dioghluin Dána, no. 80, ed. Lambert McKenna, Dublin, 1938.

MacBrody family
People from County Clare
14th-century Irish historians
14th-century Irish poets
Irish male poets